A. roseus may refer to:

 Agaricus roseus, a synonym for Mycena rosella and for Mycena rosea
 Aleurodiscus roseus, a synonym for Laeticorticium roseum
 Araneus roseus, a synonym for Micrommata virescens
 Atylus roseus, a synonym for Isopogon dubius

See also
 Roseus (disambiguation)